Bottle Hollow is an unincorporated community in Bedford County, Tennessee, United States.

References

Unincorporated communities in Bedford County, Tennessee
Unincorporated communities in Tennessee